Fixed may refer to:

 Fixed (EP), EP by Nine Inch Nails
 Fixed, an upcoming 2D adult animated film directed by Genndy Tartakovsky
 Fixed (typeface), a collection of monospace bitmap fonts that is distributed with the X Window System
 Fixed, subjected to neutering
 Fixed point (mathematics), a point that is mapped to itself by the function
 Fixed line telephone, landline

See also 
 
 
 Fix (disambiguation)
 Fixer (disambiguation)
 Fixing (disambiguation)
 Fixture (disambiguation)